Napoleon Bonaparte (born 26 October 1965) is an Indonesian police officer who last served as the Head of the International Division of the Indonesian National Police. Following his involvement in the Djoko Tjandra scandal, he was removed from office. He was brought to trial and sentenced to four years in prison.

Early life and education 
Bonaparte was born on 26 October 1965 in South Sumatra, Indonesia. He graduated from the Indonesian Police Academy in 1988.

Career 
Bonaparte began police service after graduating from the Indonesian Police Academy. While serving as Deputy Chief of Cengkareng Police in West Jakarta, Bonaparte was cast as Lieutenant Gusman, the main character of the soap opera Pedang Keadilan (The Sword of Truth), about the life of police officers, produced with the cooperation between the Indonesian National Police and Maheran Mukti Wiguna.

Bonaparte received his first appointment as the head of the police resort of Ogan Komering Ulu Regency. Two years into his office, he was transferred to the South Sumatra Provincial Police as the deputy director of the investigation and criminal department. In 2009, Bonaparte received a promotion from the rank of Police Grand Commissioner Attendant to Police Grand Commissioner, and served as the director of the investigation and criminal department in the Yogyakarta Provincial Police. The directorate handled 97 cases in his first three months as director, including the discovery of 4,200 counterfeit gas stoves and 768 counterfeit gas cans in Sleman. At the end of his tenure in Yogyakarta, he initiated an operation aimed at countering the distribution of pirated and unlicensed software.

After three years in Yogyakarta, Bonaparte  was transferred to the Criminal Investigation Agency, where he became the head of the III Subdirectorate in the Directorate of General Crime (2011–2012) and the head of the Assistance and Training Section in the Supervising Coordinator of the Civil State Officer Investigator (2012–2015). As head of the subdirectorate, he led a team to arrest the owner of an illegal arcade in Batam, Riau Islands. In 2015, he was moved from the Criminal Investigation Agency to the Indonesian Police Academy as the head of the Education Administration. A year later, he was moved to the International Relations Division of the Indonesian National Police as the Head of the International Convention Section.

On 20 July 2017, Bonaparte was appointed Secretary of the National Central Bureau, the Interpol of Indonesia. He was promoted from the rank of Police Grand Commissioner to Police Brigadier General on 5 September 2017, to the office of the International Division of the Indonesian National Police on 11 February 2020, and from Police Brigadier General to Police Inspector General two days later.

Djoko Tjandra scandal

Chronology 
Bonaparte was deemed guilty for removing the red notice—a notice used by the Interpol to identify international fugitives—of Djoko Tjandra. According to the prosecutor in Bonaparte's trial, Tjandra became acquainted with him through his friends, Tommy Sumardi and Prasetijo Utomo, who at that time held office as the Head of Coordination and Supervision of Civil Servant Investigators. Sumardi met Bonaparte on 16 April 2020 at the Trans-National Crime Center while carrying a maroon paper bag. The next day, Sumardi went again to the same place, this time accompanied by Utomo. Bonaparte supposedly said that the removal of Tjandra's red notice required a payback. He later received S$200,000 on 28 April, $100,000 on 29 April, and $150,000 on 4 May. On 4 May, he instructed one of his subordinates, Tommy Aria Dwianto, to create a letter on behalf of the International Relations Division with the title of "Renewal of Interpol Notices Data" to the Ministry of Law and Human Rights. The next day, he created a similar letter to the Ministry of Law and Human Rights, this time informing the ministry that the data had been deleted. Bonaparte received another $150,000 after sending the second letter.

Trial 
Bonaparte was removed from office on 17 July 2020 due to "ethical and disciplinary misconducts carry sanctions" following the revelation of his involvement in the Tjandra case. He was named as the suspect on 14 August, following Tjandra's return to Indonesia. He was arrested on 14 October and brought to trial on 15 February 2021. The prosecutor demanded his imprisonment for three years. However, the judge increased his sentence. On 10 March 2021, Bonaparte was found guilty of corruption and was sentenced to four years in prison and a fine of 100 million Indonesian rupiahs. He announced his plans to appeal the sentence and deemed the verdict as a "personal harassment".

Filmography

Television

References 

Living people
1965 births
Indonesian police officers
Police officers convicted of corruption